The Chapman Medal is an award of the Royal Astronomical Society, given for "investigations of outstanding merit in the science of the Sun, space and planetary environments or solar-terrestrial physics". It is named after Sydney Chapman (1888–1970), a British geophysicist who worked on solar-terrestrial physics and aeronomy. The medal was first awarded in 1973, initially on a triennial basis. From 2004-2012 it was awarded biennially, and since 2012 has been annual.

Medallists
Source: Royal Astronomical Society

See also

 List of geophysics awards

References

Astronomy prizes
Astronomy in the United Kingdom
Awards established in 1973
British science and technology awards
Royal Astronomical Society
1973 establishments in the United Kingdom
Geophysics awards